A Fleet Replacement Squadron (FRS), is a unit of the United States Navy or Marine Corps that trains Naval Aviators, Naval Flight Officers (NFOs) and enlisted Naval Aircrewmen on the specific front-line aircraft they have been assigned to fly.  Students, referred to as Replacement Pilots, Replacement Flight Officers or Replacement Aircrew are either newly winged aviators (Category I), aviators transitioning from one type aircraft to another (Category II), or aviators returning to the cockpit after a period of non-flying (Category III). After completing the training regimen, graduates are assigned to fleet squadrons.  Additionally, FRSs are responsible for training aircraft mechanics, providing replacement aircraft for fleet squadron attrition, and standardizing maintenance and aircraft operations.

The U.S. Navy and U.S Marine Corps sometimes share FRSs. For example, up until the recent establishment of an FRS for the Navy's new CMV-22 Osprey aircraft USN personnel were trained by the  USMC's VMMT-204, and all USMC F-35C pilots and maintenance personnel are trained by the USN's VFA-125. In the past, USN H-53 students were once trained at the USMC H-53 FRS and F/A-18C,D students of both service were trained in either the USMC F/A-18C,D FRS or by one of the USN's F/A-18C,D FRSs. An FRS which trains students of both services will be staffed with instructors of both services as well. 

From 1958 to 1970 the FRSs for carrier based aircraft were organized under Readiness Carrier Air Group FOUR (RCVG-4) or Readiness Antisubmarine Carrier Air Group FIFTY (RCVSG-50) in the Atlantic Fleet and Readiness Carrier Air Group TWELVE (RCVG-12) or Readiness Antisubmarine Carrier Air Group FIFTY ONE (RCVSG-51) in the Pacific Fleet. These Readiness Carrier Air Groups were colloquially called "Readiness Air Groups" or "RAGs" for short. In 1963 RCVG-4 and RCVG-12 were redesignated Readiness Carrier Air Wings RCVW-4 and RCVW-12 which had no effect on the use of the term "RAG" and in 1970 they and the remaining RCVSG-50 and 51 were disestablished which also had no effect on the use of the term "RAG" and to this day Fleet Replacement Squadrons are still referred to as "RAGs". 

Note: The parenthetical (1st) or (2nd) appended to some squadron designations in the tables below are not a part of that squadron's designation.  They are added to indicate that the designation was used more than one time during the history of U.S. Naval Aviation and to specify which use of the designation is indicated.

Currently Active USN and USMC Fleet Replacement Squadrons
Since the disestablishment of RCVW-4, RCVW-12, RCVSG-50 and RCVSG-51 in 1970 all U.S Navy Fleet Replacement Squadrons (FRS)s are placed organizationally under the Type Wing commander for the respective aircraft type/model. U.S Marine Corps Fleet Replacement Squadrons are organizationally aligned under a Marine Aircraft Group (MAG) which operates that type/model aircraft.

US Navy

US Marine Corps

Disestablished, Deactivated, Re-designated or otherwise former Fleet Replacement Squadrons
Beginning 1 April 1958 the Navy organized the training squadrons for its carrier based aircraft into Readiness Carrier Air Groups (RCVG) (later renamed Readiness Carrier Air Wings (RCVW)) or Readiness Anti-Submarine Carrier Air Groups (RCVSG). The training squadrons for non-carrier based aircraft operated separately from the RCVGs/RCVWs and RCVSGs. While most squadrons listed below were dedicated Fleet Replacement Squadrons, some such as VAQ-33, VAQ-130, HC-1, HC-2 and HC-16 operated a department which performed as an FRS while the remainder of the squadron performed operational or other fleet support functions. The tables below list the former Fleet Replacement Squadrons of the U.S Navy and U.S. Marine Corps.

Squadrons of former Readiness Carrier Air Group FOUR (RCVG-4)/Readiness Carrier Air Wing FOUR (RCVW-4)
On 1 April 1958 Carrier Air Group FOUR (tail code AD) was re-tasked as the Atlantic Fleet's training air group and it was redesignated Readiness Carrier Air Group FOUR (RCVG-4). On 20 December 1963 all Carrier Air Groups were redesignated as Carrier Air Wings and RCVG-4 became Readiness Carrier Air Wing FOUR (RCVW-4). RCVW-4 was disestablished on 1 June 1970 and its squadrons were placed under the control of the respective Type Wing for each squadron's aircraft. The squadrons of the disestablished RCVW-4 retained the AD tail code after their realignment to their Type Wings.

Squadrons of former Readiness Carrier Air Group TWELVE (RCVG-12)/Readiness Carrier Air Wing TWELVE (RCVW-12)
On 1 April 1958 Carrier Air Group TWELVE (tail code NJ) was re-tasked as the Pacific Fleet's training air group and it was redesignated Readiness Carrier Air Group TWELVE (RCVG-12). On 20 December 1963 all Carrier Air Groups were redesignated as Carrier Air Wings and RCVG-12 became Readiness Carrier Air Wing TWELVE (RCVW-12). RCVW-12 was disestablished on 30 June 1970 and its squadrons were placed under the control of the respective Type Wing for each squadron's aircraft. The squadrons of the disestablished RCVW-12 retained the NJ tail code after their realignment to their Type Wings.

Squadrons of former Readiness Antisubmarine Carrier Air Group FIFTY (RCVSG-50)
On 30 June 1960 Readiness Antisubmarine Carrier Air Group FIFTY (tail code AR) was established as a training air group to support the Atlantic Fleet's newly establishing Antisubmarine Carrier Air Groups which were being paired with the Navy's Antisubmarine Aircraft Carriers (CVS). The CVSs were re-purposed WWII Essex class carriers to respond to the growing Soviet submarine threat. RCVSG-50 was disestablished in February 1971 and its squadrons were placed under the control of the respective Type Wing for each squadron's aircraft. The squadrons of the disestablished RCVSG-50 retained the AR tail code after their realignment to their Type Wings.

Squadrons of former Readiness Antisubmarine Carrier Air Group FIFTY ONE (RCVSG-51)
On 30 June 1960 Readiness Antisubmarine Carrier Air Group FIFTY ONE (tail code RA) was established as a training air group to support the Pacific Fleet's newly establishing Antisubmarine Carrier Air Groups. It was disestablished 30 June 1970 and its squadrons were placed under the control of the respective Type Wing for each squadron's aircraft. The squadrons of the disestablished RCVSG-50 retained the RA tail code after their realignment to their Type Wings.

Other Former U.S. Navy Fleet Replacement Squadrons
The Fleet Replacement Squadrons below were training squadrons for non-carrier based aircraft or were retasked, established or reactivated as Fleet Replacement Squadrons after the disestablishment of RCVW-4, RCVW-12, RCVSG-50 and RCVSG-51

Former U.S. Marine Corps Fleet Replacement Squadrons

See also

 List of active United States Marine Corps aircraft squadrons
 List of inactive United States Marine Corps aircraft squadrons
 List of United States Navy aircraft squadrons
 List of inactive United States Navy aircraft squadrons
 List of United States Navy aircraft wings

References

United States Marine Corps aviation
United States naval aviation